Kiri Sakor District is a district (srok) of Koh Kong Province, in south-western Cambodia. All of Kiri Sakor is part of Botum Sakor National Park since 1993.

Administration 
The district is subdivided into three khum (communes) and nine phum (villages).

See also
 Botum Sakor National Park
 Dara Sakor International Airport

Notes

Districts of Koh Kong province